Buariki is a settlement in Kiribati.  It is located on a Tabiteuea atoll; It serves as the capital of Tabiteuea South district. Nikutoru is to its east and Taungaeaka to its north.

Populated places in Kiribati
Tabiteuea